The 1961 VFL season was the 65th season of the Victorian Football League (VFL), the highest level senior Australian rules football competition in Victoria. The season featured twelve clubs, ran from 15 April until 23 September, and comprised an 18-game home-and-away season followed by a finals series featuring the top four clubs.

The premiership was won by the Hawthorn Football Club for the first time, after it defeated  by 43 points in the 1961 VFL Grand Final.

Premiership season
In 1961, the VFL competition consisted of twelve teams of 18 on-the-field players each, plus two substitute players, known as the 19th man and the 20th man. A player could be substituted for any reason; however, once substituted, a player could not return to the field of play under any circumstances.

Teams played each other in a home-and-away season of 18 rounds; matches 12 to 18 were the "home-and-way reverse" of matches 1 to 7.

Once the 18 round home-and-away season had finished, the 1961 VFL Premiers were determined by the specific format and conventions of the Page–McIntyre system.

Round 1

|- bgcolor="#CCCCFF"
| Home team
| Home team score
| Away team
| Away team score
| Venue
| Crowd
| Date
|- bgcolor="#FFFFFF"
| 
| 7.14 (56)
| 
| 11.15 (81)
| Glenferrie Oval
| 20,000
| 15 April 1961
|- bgcolor="#FFFFFF"
| 
| 6.10 (46)
| 
| 10.15 (75)
| Brunswick Street Oval
| 31,787
| 15 April 1961
|- bgcolor="#FFFFFF"
| 
| 11.8 (74)
| 
| 15.12 (102)
| Punt Road Oval
| 20,000
| 15 April 1961
|- bgcolor="#FFFFFF"
| 
| 8.10 (58)
| 
| 6.13 (49)
| Arden Street Oval
| 24,000
| 15 April 1961
|- bgcolor="#FFFFFF"
| 
| 13.18 (96)
| 
| 8.9 (57)
| Kardinia Park
| 23,973
| 15 April 1961
|- bgcolor="#FFFFFF"
| 
| 5.8 (38)
| 
| 6.12 (48)
| Junction Oval
| 30,400
| 15 April 1961

Round 2

|- bgcolor="#CCCCFF"
| Home team
| Home team score
| Away team
| Away team score
| Venue
| Crowd
| Date
|- bgcolor="#FFFFFF"
| 
| 13.19 (97)
| 
| 8.4 (52)
| Western Oval
| 22,178
| 22 April 1961
|- bgcolor="#FFFFFF"
| 
| 13.7 (85)
| 
| 9.15 (69)
| Windy Hill
| 23,000
| 22 April 1961
|- bgcolor="#FFFFFF"
| 
| 3.16 (34)
| 
| 7.15 (57)
| Victoria Park
| 23,000
| 22 April 1961
|- bgcolor="#FFFFFF"
| 
| 9.5 (59)
| 
| 6.18 (54)
| Princes Park
| 29,384
| 22 April 1961
|- bgcolor="#FFFFFF"
| 
| 5.14 (44)
| 
| 11.10 (76)
| MCG
| 34,640
| 22 April 1961
|- bgcolor="#FFFFFF"
| 
| 12.8 (80)
| 
| 12.12 (84)
| Lake Oval
| 24,258
| 22 April 1961

Round 3

|- bgcolor="#CCCCFF"
| Home team
| Home team score
| Away team
| Away team score
| Venue
| Crowd
| Date
|- bgcolor="#FFFFFF"
| 
| 6.9 (45)
| 
| 12.17 (89)
| Punt Road Oval
| 27,650
| 25 April 1961
|- bgcolor="#FFFFFF"
| 
| 8.9 (57)
| 
| 11.16 (82)
| Windy Hill
| 32,000
| 25 April 1961
|- bgcolor="#FFFFFF"
| 
| 12.16 (88)
| 
| 9.8 (62)
| Victoria Park
| 26,574
| 29 April 1961
|- bgcolor="#FFFFFF"
| 
| 11.6 (72)
| 
| 11.15 (81)
| Princes Park
| 34,254
| 29 April 1961
|- bgcolor="#FFFFFF"
| 
| 12.11 (83)
| 
| 6.14 (50)
| Junction Oval
| 29,300
| 29 April 1961
|- bgcolor="#FFFFFF"
| 
| 13.17 (95)
| 
| 10.9 (69)
| Glenferrie Oval
| 21,500
| 29 April 1961

Round 4

|- bgcolor="#CCCCFF"
| Home team
| Home team score
| Away team
| Away team score
| Venue
| Crowd
| Date
|- bgcolor="#FFFFFF"
| 
| 12.9 (81)
| 
| 12.12 (84)
| MCG
| 40,572
| 6 May 1961
|- bgcolor="#FFFFFF"
| 
| 13.17 (95)
| 
| 16.12 (108)
| Brunswick Street Oval
| 17,861
| 6 May 1961
|- bgcolor="#FFFFFF"
| 
| 8.7 (55)
| 
| 12.13 (85)
| Arden Street Oval
| 13,500
| 6 May 1961
|- bgcolor="#FFFFFF"
| 
| 7.19 (61)
| 
| 22.11 (143)
| Kardinia Park
| 21,437
| 6 May 1961
|- bgcolor="#FFFFFF"
| 
| 10.13 (73)
| 
| 10.4 (64)
| Western Oval
| 34,029
| 6 May 1961
|- bgcolor="#FFFFFF"
| 
| 7.14 (56)
| 
| 11.6 (72)
| Lake Oval
| 25,624
| 6 May 1961

Round 5

|- bgcolor="#CCCCFF"
| Home team
| Home team score
| Away team
| Away team score
| Venue
| Crowd
| Date
|- bgcolor="#FFFFFF"
| 
| 13.7 (85)
| 
| 11.20 (86)
| Punt Road Oval
| 22,000
| 13 May 1961
|- bgcolor="#FFFFFF"
| 
| 7.13 (55)
| 
| 17.18 (120)
| Kardinia Park
| 18,673
| 13 May 1961
|- bgcolor="#FFFFFF"
| 
| 8.7 (55)
| 
| 16.20 (116)
| Victoria Park
| 30,560
| 13 May 1961
|- bgcolor="#FFFFFF"
| 
| 12.12 (84)
| 
| 12.10 (82)
| Lake Oval
| 26,748
| 13 May 1961
|- bgcolor="#FFFFFF"
| 
| 9.21 (75)
| 
| 12.4 (76)
| Glenferrie Oval
| 31,000
| 13 May 1961
|- bgcolor="#FFFFFF"
| 
| 11.17 (83)
| 
| 17.7 (109)
| Arden Street Oval
| 21,500
| 13 May 1961

Round 6

|- bgcolor="#CCCCFF"
| Home team
| Home team score
| Away team
| Away team score
| Venue
| Crowd
| Date
|- bgcolor="#FFFFFF"
| 
| 14.13 (97)
| 
| 11.13 (79)
| Brunswick Street Oval
| 17,693
| 20 May 1961
|- bgcolor="#FFFFFF"
| 
| 20.13 (133)
| 
| 6.18 (54)
| Windy Hill
| 32,600
| 20 May 1961
|- bgcolor="#FFFFFF"
| 
| 9.14 (68)
| 
| 16.16 (112)
| Punt Road Oval
| 24,600
| 20 May 1961
|- bgcolor="#FFFFFF"
| 
| 9.8 (62)
| 
| 13.9 (87)
| Western Oval
| 29,490
| 27 May 1961
|- bgcolor="#FFFFFF"
| 
| 9.11 (65)
| 
| 7.12 (54)
| Princes Park
| 33,161
| 27 May 1961
|- bgcolor="#FFFFFF"
| 
| 14.16 (100)
| 
| 12.9 (81)
| Junction Oval
| 32,900
| 27 May 1961

Round 7

|- bgcolor="#CCCCFF"
| Home team
| Home team score
| Away team
| Away team score
| Venue
| Crowd
| Date
|- bgcolor="#FFFFFF"
| 
| 9.14 (68)
| 
| 11.16 (82)
| Arden Street Oval
| 13,000
| 3 June 1961
|- bgcolor="#FFFFFF"
| 
| 10.13 (73)
| 
| 8.12 (60)
| Glenferrie Oval
| 15,000
| 3 June 1961
|- bgcolor="#FFFFFF"
| 
| 18.11 (119)
| 
| 8.10 (58)
| Victoria Park
| 28,290
| 3 June 1961
|- bgcolor="#FFFFFF"
| 
| 13.13 (91)
| 
| 4.14 (38)
| Kardinia Park
| 18,683
| 3 June 1961
|- bgcolor="#FFFFFF"
| 
| 7.8 (50)
| 
| 17.15 (117)
| Lake Oval
| 14,500
| 3 June 1961
|- bgcolor="#FFFFFF"
| 
| 15.14 (104)
| 
| 11.13 (79)
| MCG
| 49,678
| 3 June 1961

Round 8

|- bgcolor="#CCCCFF"
| Home team
| Home team score
| Away team
| Away team score
| Venue
| Crowd
| Date
|- bgcolor="#FFFFFF"
| 
| 16.14 (110)
| 
| 5.16 (46)
| Junction Oval
| 28,800
| 10 June 1961
|- bgcolor="#FFFFFF"
| 
| 11.13 (79)
| 
| 11.13 (79)
| Arden Street Oval
| 16,000
| 10 June 1961
|- bgcolor="#FFFFFF"
| 
| 10.14 (74)
| 
| 6.18 (54)
| Brunswick Street Oval
| 28,083
| 10 June 1961
|- bgcolor="#FFFFFF"
| 
| 14.19 (103)
| 
| 13.13 (91)
| Western Oval
| 24,132
| 12 June 1961
|- bgcolor="#FFFFFF"
| 
| 7.7 (49)
| 
| 13.11 (89)
| Princes Park
| 24,660
| 12 June 1961
|- bgcolor="#FFFFFF"
| 
| 17.19 (121)
| 
| 7.10 (52)
| MCG
| 78,465
| 12 June 1961

Round 9

|- bgcolor="#CCCCFF"
| Home team
| Home team score
| Away team
| Away team score
| Venue
| Crowd
| Date
|- bgcolor="#FFFFFF"
| 
| 9.7 (61)
| 
| 10.10 (70)
| Kardinia Park
| 14,197
| 17 June 1961
|- bgcolor="#FFFFFF"
| 
| 14.10 (94)
| 
| 12.12 (84)
| Victoria Park
| 27,280
| 17 June 1961
|- bgcolor="#FFFFFF"
| 
| 12.10 (82)
| 
| 10.16 (76)
| Punt Road Oval
| 10,000
| 17 June 1961
|- bgcolor="#FFFFFF"
| 
| 8.14 (62)
| 
| 14.14 (98)
| Lake Oval
| 10,200
| 17 June 1961
|- bgcolor="#FFFFFF"
| 
| 9.5 (59)
| 
| 9.9 (63)
| Western Oval
| 21,197
| 17 June 1961
|- bgcolor="#FFFFFF"
| 
| 12.17 (89)
| 
| 7.12 (54)
| Windy Hill
| 23,000
| 17 June 1961

Round 10

|- bgcolor="#CCCCFF"
| Home team
| Home team score
| Away team
| Away team score
| Venue
| Crowd
| Date
|- bgcolor="#FFFFFF"
| 
| 12.12 (84)
| 
| 6.8 (44)
| Victoria Park
| 24,637
| 24 June 1961
|- bgcolor="#FFFFFF"
| 
| 5.14 (44)
| 
| 14.9 (93)
| Arden Street Oval
| 11,500
| 24 June 1961
|- bgcolor="#FFFFFF"
| 
| 8.11 (59)
| 
| 4.13 (37)
| Junction Oval
| 28,100
| 24 June 1961
|- bgcolor="#FFFFFF"
| 
| 9.10 (64)
| 
| 8.9 (57)
| Kardinia Park
| 16,881
| 24 June 1961
|- bgcolor="#FFFFFF"
| 
| 12.20 (92)
| 
| 10.14 (74)
| Punt Road Oval
| 23,000
| 24 June 1961
|- bgcolor="#FFFFFF"
| 
| 12.6 (78)
| 
| 6.10 (46)
| Glenferrie Oval
| 21,500
| 24 June 1961

Round 11

|- bgcolor="#CCCCFF"
| Home team
| Home team score
| Away team
| Away team score
| Venue
| Crowd
| Date
|- bgcolor="#FFFFFF"
| 
| 17.18 (120)
| 
| 7.12 (54)
| MCG
| 38,000
| 1 July 1961
|- bgcolor="#FFFFFF"
| 
| 9.9 (63)
| 
| 9.8 (62)
| Brunswick Street Oval
| 19,291
| 1 July 1961
|- bgcolor="#FFFFFF"
| 
| 12.11 (83)
| 
| 13.14 (92)
| Windy Hill
| 22,440
| 1 July 1961
|- bgcolor="#FFFFFF"
| 
| 10.18 (78)
| 
| 17.16 (118)
| Princes Park
| 17,936
| 1 July 1961
|- bgcolor="#FFFFFF"
| 
| 9.14 (68)
| 
| 7.8 (50)
| Lake Oval
| 8,750
| 1 July 1961
|- bgcolor="#FFFFFF"
| 
| 13.12 (90)
| 
| 4.12 (36)
| Glenferrie Oval
| 31,500
| 1 July 1961

Round 12

|- bgcolor="#CCCCFF"
| Home team
| Home team score
| Away team
| Away team score
| Venue
| Crowd
| Date
|- bgcolor="#FFFFFF"
| 
| 6.6 (42)
| 
| 4.9 (33)
| Western Oval
| 16,648
| 8 July 1961
|- bgcolor="#FFFFFF"
| 
| 9.9 (63)
| 
| 3.10 (28)
| Windy Hill
| 12,800
| 8 July 1961
|- bgcolor="#FFFFFF"
| 
| 5.11 (41)
| 
| 8.10 (58)
| Victoria Park
| 20,700
| 8 July 1961
|- bgcolor="#FFFFFF"
| 
| 9.8 (62)
| 
| 3.12 (30)
| Princes Park
| 14,636
| 8 July 1961
|- bgcolor="#FFFFFF"
| 
| 7.7 (49)
| 
| 9.11 (65)
| Lake Oval
| 13,860
| 8 July 1961
|- bgcolor="#FFFFFF"
| 
| 6.8 (44)
| 
| 6.8 (44)
| MCG
| 29,947
| 8 July 1961

Round 13

|- bgcolor="#CCCCFF"
| Home team
| Home team score
| Away team
| Away team score
| Venue
| Crowd
| Date
|- bgcolor="#FFFFFF"
| 
| 8.10 (58)
| 
| 5.10 (40)
| Glenferrie Oval
| 27,500
| 15 July 1961
|- bgcolor="#FFFFFF"
| 
| 10.15 (75)
| 
| 11.6 (72)
| Arden Street Oval
| 15,000
| 15 July 1961
|- bgcolor="#FFFFFF"
| 
| 5.8 (38)
| 
| 6.18 (54)
| Punt Road Oval
| 22,799
| 15 July 1961
|- bgcolor="#FFFFFF"
| 
| 11.16 (82)
| 
| 9.13 (67)
| Kardinia Park
| 18,489
| 22 July 1961
|- bgcolor="#FFFFFF"
| 
| 13.20 (98)
| 
| 7.8 (50)
| Junction Oval
| 34,600
| 22 July 1961
|- bgcolor="#FFFFFF"
| 
| 12.13 (85)
| 
| 9.22 (76)
| Brunswick Street Oval
| 34,561
| 22 July 1961

Round 14

|- bgcolor="#CCCCFF"
| Home team
| Home team score
| Away team
| Away team score
| Venue
| Crowd
| Date
|- bgcolor="#FFFFFF"
| 
| 11.7 (73)
| 
| 10.8 (68)
| Kardinia Park
| 25,723
| 29 July 1961
|- bgcolor="#FFFFFF"
| 
| 12.15 (87)
| 
| 13.16 (94)
| Brunswick Street Oval
| 23,012
| 29 July 1961
|- bgcolor="#FFFFFF"
| 
| 16.9 (105)
| 
| 9.14 (68)
| Lake Oval
| 14,350
| 29 July 1961
|- bgcolor="#FFFFFF"
| 
| 10.18 (78)
| 
| 13.9 (87)
| MCG
| 31,455
| 29 July 1961
|- bgcolor="#FFFFFF"
| 
| 9.13 (67)
| 
| 9.10 (64)
| Arden Street Oval
| 15,000
| 29 July 1961
|- bgcolor="#FFFFFF"
| 
| 12.11 (83)
| 
| 7.9 (51)
| Western Oval
| 21,639
| 29 July 1961

Round 15

|- bgcolor="#CCCCFF"
| Home team
| Home team score
| Away team
| Away team score
| Venue
| Crowd
| Date
|- bgcolor="#FFFFFF"
| 
| 15.10 (100)
| 
| 6.11 (47)
| Glenferrie Oval
| 14,000
| 5 August 1961
|- bgcolor="#FFFFFF"
| 
| 13.16 (94)
| 
| 7.14 (56)
| Windy Hill
| 27,500
| 5 August 1961
|- bgcolor="#FFFFFF"
| 
| 5.10 (40)
| 
| 11.12 (78)
| Victoria Park
| 22,324
| 5 August 1961
|- bgcolor="#FFFFFF"
| 
| 17.9 (111)
| 
| 7.10 (52)
| Princes Park
| 16,889
| 5 August 1961
|- bgcolor="#FFFFFF"
| 
| 9.12 (66)
| 
| 7.13 (55)
| Junction Oval
| 33,100
| 5 August 1961
|- bgcolor="#FFFFFF"
| 
| 9.9 (63)
| 
| 9.14 (68)
| Punt Road Oval
| 15,547
| 5 August 1961

Round 16

|- bgcolor="#CCCCFF"
| Home team
| Home team score
| Away team
| Away team score
| Venue
| Crowd
| Date
|- bgcolor="#FFFFFF"
| 
| 14.17 (101)
| 
| 5.16 (46)
| Western Oval
| 19,242
| 12 August 1961
|- bgcolor="#FFFFFF"
| 
| 10.12 (72)
| 
| 11.13 (79)
| Windy Hill
| 27,200
| 12 August 1961
|- bgcolor="#FFFFFF"
| 
| 9.16 (70)
| 
| 10.8 (68)
| Princes Park
| 15,439
| 12 August 1961
|- bgcolor="#FFFFFF"
| 
| 12.19 (91)
| 
| 0.8 (8)
| Junction Oval
| 20,600
| 12 August 1961
|- bgcolor="#FFFFFF"
| 
| 12.17 (89)
| 
| 12.15 (87)
| MCG
| 48,245
| 12 August 1961
|- bgcolor="#FFFFFF"
| 
| 12.20 (92)
| 
| 10.10 (70)
| Brunswick Street Oval
| 23,768
| 12 August 1961

Round 17

|- bgcolor="#CCCCFF"
| Home team
| Home team score
| Away team
| Away team score
| Venue
| Crowd
| Date
|- bgcolor="#FFFFFF"
| 
| 19.6 (120)
| 
| 14.7 (91)
| Glenferrie Oval
| 34,500
| 19 August 1961
|- bgcolor="#FFFFFF"
| 
| 11.11 (77)
| 
| 6.10 (46)
| Kardinia Park
| 17,976
| 19 August 1961
|- bgcolor="#FFFFFF"
| 
| 11.22 (88)
| 
| 7.6 (48)
| MCG
| 52,195
| 19 August 1961
|- bgcolor="#FFFFFF"
| 
| 10.15 (75)
| 
| 8.15 (63)
| Arden Street Oval
| 15,000
| 19 August 1961
|- bgcolor="#FFFFFF"
| 
| 11.12 (78)
| 
| 16.11 (107)
| Lake Oval
| 14,125
| 19 August 1961
|- bgcolor="#FFFFFF"
| 
| 10.12 (72)
| 
| 13.10 (88)
| Victoria Park
| 31,849
| 19 August 1961

Round 18

|- bgcolor="#CCCCFF"
| Home team
| Home team score
| Away team
| Away team score
| Venue
| Crowd
| Date
|- bgcolor="#FFFFFF"
| 
| 12.12 (84)
| 
| 8.15 (63)
| Western Oval
| 42,015
| 26 August 1961
|- bgcolor="#FFFFFF"
| 
| 25.29 (179)
| 
| 11.10 (76)
| Brunswick Street Oval
| 12,815
| 26 August 1961
|- bgcolor="#FFFFFF"
| 
| 13.12 (90)
| 
| 13.13 (91)
| Princes Park
| 21,863
| 26 August 1961
|- bgcolor="#FFFFFF"
| 
| 10.12 (72)
| 
| 9.13 (67)
| Junction Oval
| 24,250
| 26 August 1961
|- bgcolor="#FFFFFF"
| 
| 8.8 (56)
| 
| 11.15 (81)
| Punt Road Oval
| 15,177
| 26 August 1961
|- bgcolor="#FFFFFF"
| 
| 12.16 (88)
| 
| 13.10 (88)
| Windy Hill
| 18,500
| 26 August 1961

Ladder

Consolation night series competition
The night series were held under the floodlights at Lake Oval, South Melbourne, for the teams (5th to 12th on ladder) out of the finals at the end of the season.

Final: Geelong 9.20 (74) defeated North Melbourne 9.8 (62)

Finals series

The 1961 VFL finals series was contested under the Page–McIntyre system, which had been used since 1931.

Week one

Week two

Week three

Week four

Awards
 The 1961 VFL Premiership team was Hawthorn.
 The VFL's leading goalkicker was Tom Carroll of Carlton who kicked 54 goals.
 The winner of the 1961 Brownlow Medal was John James of Carlton with 21 votes.
 North Melbourne took the "wooden spoon" in 1961.
St Kilda 7.14 (56) defeated  5.16 (46) in the grand final, which was held as a stand-alone match on 30 September because the second semi-final was drawn and required a replay; the match was played at the Melbourne Cricket Ground before a crowd of 15,242.

Notable events
 St Kilda ended a twenty-two year finals appearance drought making the finals for the first time since 1939. This currently stands as the fourth longest finals appearance drought in league history.
 Following a VFL investigation of a complaint that game officials had not reported the incident, rugged South Melbourne ruckman Ken Boyd was suspended for 12 matches, for striking Carlton ruckman John Nicholls.
 In Round 16, Richmond was held goalless by St Kilda. This was the first time a team had been held goalless in a match since Round 11, 1921; and (as of 2021) is the last time it has occurred.
 Having decided to abandon its (1957–1960) experiment of allowing live telecasts of the last quarter of three VFL matches each Saturday afternoon on ABV-2, HSV-7, and GTV-9, the VFL rejected offers from the three television stations to broadcast replays on Saturday evenings. A separate arrangement was made to allow a replay of the entire grand final match.
 In November, Collingwood announced that it has delisted sixteen players from its 1961 playing list, including Ian Brewer and Barry "Hooker" Harrison.

References

 Maplestone, M., Flying Higher: History of the Essendon Football Club 1872–1996, Essendon Football Club, (Melbourne), 1996. 
 Rogers, S. & Brown, A., Every Game Ever Played: VFL/AFL Results 1897–1997 (Sixth Edition), Viking Books, (Ringwood), 1998. 
 Ross, J. (ed), 100 Years of Australian Football 1897–1996: The Complete Story of the AFL, All the Big Stories, All the Great Pictures, All the Champions, Every AFL Season Reported, Viking, (Ringwood), 1996.

External links
 1961 Season – AFL Tables

Australian Football League seasons
VFL season